Cameron Munter (born 1954) is a retired diplomat, academic, and executive who now works as a global consultant.  He was President and CEO of the EastWest Institute (EWI) in New York from 2015 to 2019, directing conflict resolution projects in Russia, China, the Middle East, South Asia, and the Balkans.  He is currently a senior fellow of the CEVRO Institute in Prague and the Atlantic Council in Washington, and serves on a number of corporate and nonprofit boards.

Early life and education
Munter was born in California, in 1954, graduating from Claremont High School in 1972. He attended Cornell University in Ithaca, New York, graduated magna cum laude in 1976 with a B.A.,[6] and the universities of Freiburg and Marburg in Germany. He received a PhD in modern European history in 1983 from Johns Hopkins Universityin Baltimore, Maryland.

Postgraduate work
Munter taught European history at the University of California in Los Angeles (1982–1984) and directed European Studies at the Twentieth Century Fund in New York (1984–1985) before joining the Foreign Service.

Career
Munter served as U.S. Ambassador to Pakistan from 2010 to 2012, during the time of the raid in which Osama bin Ladin was killed. He was U.S. Ambassador to Serbia from 2007 to 2009, when Kosovo became independent. A career Foreign Service Officer, Munter was Deputy Chief of Mission at the American Embassy in Prague, Czech Republic, from August 2005 to June 2007. He volunteered to lead the first Provincial Reconstruction Team in Mosul, Iraq, from January through July 2006, and then returned to Prague. He came to Prague from Warsaw, Poland, where he served as Deputy Chief of Mission from 2002 to 2005.

Before these assignments, in Washington, D.C., Munter was Director for Central, Eastern, and Northern Europe at the National Security Council (1999–2001), Executive Assistant to the Counselor of the Department of State (1998–1999), Director of the Northern European Initiative (1998), and Chief of Staff in the NATO Enlargement Ratification Office (1997–1998).

He has also served overseas in Bonn, Germany (1995–1997), Prague (1992–1995), and Warsaw (1986–1988). His other domestic assignments include serving as Country Director for Czechoslovakia at the Department of State (1989–1991), Dean Rusk Fellow at Georgetown University's Institute for the Study of Diplomacy (1991), and Staff Assistant in the Bureau of European Affairs (1988–1989). He retired from the diplomatic service in 2012 and taught international relations at Columbia Law School (2012) and Pomona College (2013-2015) before coming to EWI.

See also 
Ambassadors from the United States

References

External links

1954 births
Living people
Cornell University alumni
Ambassadors of the United States to Serbia
Ambassadors of the United States to Pakistan
United States National Security Council staffers
United States Special Envoys
United States Foreign Service personnel
Pomona College faculty